Barcus is a commune in the Pyrénées-Atlantiques department in the Nouvelle-Aquitaine region of southwestern France in the former province of Soule.

The inhabitants of the commune are known in French as Barcusiens or Barcusiennes and in Basque as Barkoxtar.

Geography

Location
Barcus is located in the Massif des Arbailles in the former province of Soule some 25 km south by south-east of Sauveterre-de-Béarn and 12 km west of Oloron-Sainte-Marie. The commune covers a complex of valleys formed by the course of the Joos and its left and right tributaries - the Paradis district, for example, is located on the Ibarra and the former hamlet of Guibelhéguiet is on a tributary of the Joos.

Access
Access to the commune is by the D24 road from Chéraute in the west which passes through the centre of the commune and continues east to Esquiule. The D347 branches from the D26 west of the village and goes south to Tardets-Sorholus. The D59 comes from Saint-Goin in the north-east through the village and continues south down the eastern side of the commune to Montory. The D859 branches off the D59 in the north of the commune and goes north to join the D25 north of the commune. The D159 branches off the D59 halfway down the commune and goes east to join the D24 east of Esquiule. The D459 branches off the D59 in the south of the commune and goes south-east to Lanne-en-Barétous.

Hydrography
The commune is located in the drainage basin of the Adour. The Joos river rises west of the commune and flows east across the commune then north, forming the eastern border of the commune, continuing north-east to eventually join the Gave d'Oloron at Préchacq-Josbaig. Many tributaries rise in the commune and flow east into the Joos including the Bouhatéko erreka, the arréc of Etchanchu, the Handia, the Oyhanart erreka, the arriou of Soulou, the Sustaris erreka, and the Ibarra stream (7 km long) with its tributaries, the Ruisseau Ibarra (4.4 km, which is joined in the commune by the Askontchilo erreka and the Athaketa stream) and the Lecheguita stream (also with its tributary the Ilharra stream). Paul Raymond mentioned another tributary of the Joos crossing Barcus called the Guibéléguiet with its tributary the Paradis.

Tributaries of the Lausset, which also flows into the Gave d'Oloron, also pass through the commune such as the Ascania stream and the Ibarle stream with its tributary the Ambelseko erreka.

Finally the Ruisseau de Lacoste, a sub-tributary of the arréc of Bitole also crosses the commune.

Places and Hamlets
There are a large number of places and hamlets in the commune:

 Agaras
 Agor (border)
 Agorria
 Aguerborda
 Aguerret
 Aistor
 Alkkatia
 Ahargo
 Ainus
 Alhorchar
 Arambeaux
 Aramburu
 Aranéder
 Arangaray
 Arhanchet
 Arthaxet
 Artheguiet
 Artzanüthürry
 Askain
 Askonobiet
 Askoz
 Askozborda
 Athaket
 Athakéta
 Ayscar
 Bagardikoborda
 Baralegne (pass)
 Barbieborda
 Barbieko Eyhéra
 Barcardats
 Barcochbide
 Barnetche
 Barrenkia
 Belloya
 Beltchun
 Beltzantzuburu
 Berhaburu
 Berho
 Bermaillou
 Betan
 Beteria
 Bidau
 Bigne (pass)
 Biscay
 Bohogu
 Bordabegoïty
 Bordaburia
 Bordacharia
 Bordagay
 Bordagoyhen
 Bordetta
 Burgia
 Cabana
 Cachau
 Chiloua
 Choko
 Chourikoborro
 Cocutchia
 Cotabaren
 Cotiart
 Coyos
 Coyosborda
 La Croix Blanche
 Curutchiga
 Doronda
 Duque
 Eihartzéta
 Elhar
 Elhurdoy
 Eperrape
 Eperregagne
 Erguillota
 Errande
 Errékartéa
 Espel
 Espelia
 Estecondo
 Etchahoun
 Etchanchu
 Etchandy
 Etchartéa
 Etchebarne
 Etcheberriborda
 Etcheberry (2 places)
 Etchecopaberria
 Etchegoren
 Eyharche
 Eyhartzet
 Eyhea
 Eyheregaray (2 places)
 Eyhéramendy
 Fabiania
 Gagnéko Borda
 Galharetborda
 Garay
 Garrat
 Gastellondo
 Gorostordoy
 Gorrostibar
 Goyheneix
 Goyheski
 Goyhetsia
 Goytolia
 Guibelhéguiet
 Haritchast
 Haritchelhar
 Harritchilondo
 Haubiga
 Hégoburu
 Héguiapal
 Heguilla
 Héguitchoussy
 Ibar
 Ibarrondo
 Idiart
 Ihitzaga
 Ilharra
 Itchal
 Jacobia
 Jaureguiberry
 Lagune
 Lapitz
 Lapitzia
 Larragorry
 Larranda
 Larrandabuia
 Larrasquet
 Larrorry
 Laxague
 Laxagueborda
 Lecheguita (pass, 653 m)
 Legegaray
 Lépazka
 Lescarpé
 Logeborde
 Lohidoy
 Lohidoyborda
 Lojaborda
 Malobra
 Maysonnave
 Menusketa
 Mercaptpide
 Mercaptpide Borda
 Mignaborda
 Miranda
 Mocho
 Montokoaltéa
 Muskogorry
 Nissibart
 Oholéguy
 Oilher
 Ondarzuhia
 Ordanoulet
 Ostallaborda
 Oyhanart
 Paradis
 Pelento
 Pellen
 Perkain
 Petchia
 Petillon
 Picochet
 Pinka
 Pordoy
 Potho
 Princi
 Princiborda
 Puchulu
 Restoy
 Sagardoyhégui
 Salaber
 Salazar
 Salazarborda
 Salhanka
 Sapiula
 Sardo
 Saruborda
 Seceneguiet
 Sinto
 Sorhotus
 Suhatsola
 Thias
 Topet
 Udoy
 Uhalt
 Uhaltborda
 Uhart
 Urrustoy
 Urruty
 Uthuère
 Uthurralt
 Uthurry
 Zatzoury

Toponymy
The commune name in Basque is Barkoxe.

Jean-Baptiste Orpustan proposes a Basque etymological construction in two parts. The first element barr meaning "located inside, at the bottom" is joined to the element -koiz to approximate the Basque goiz meaning "morning or east". Barcus is located in a low valley to the east which justifies the Orpustan analysis.

The following table details the origins of the commune name and other names in the commune.

Sources:
Raymond: Topographic Dictionary of the Department of Basses-Pyrenees, 1863, on the page numbers indicated in the table. 
Orpustan: Jean-Baptiste Orpustan,  New Basque Toponymy
Bulletin des Lois: 

Origins:
Navarrenx: Notaries of Navarrenx
Oloron: Notaries of Oloron-Sainte-Marie
Ohix: Contracts retained by Ohix, Notary of Soule
Customs: Customs of Soule
Luxe: Titles of Luxe
Guienne: Government General of Guienne and Guascogne and neighbouring country

History
Jean-Baptiste Orpustan noted that the commune was a former "royal town".

Paul Raymond on page 21 of his 1863 dictionary noted that the commune had a Lay Abbey, vassal of the Viscounts of Soule. In 1790 Barcus was the capital of a Canton dependent on the District of Mauleon Licharre and made up of the communes of Barcus, L'Hôpital-Saint-Blaise, and Roquiague.

Barcus appears as Barcux on the 1750 Cassini Map and the same on the 1790 version.

Administration

List of Successive Mayors

Inter-communality
The commune is part of five inter-communal structures:
 the Communauté d'agglomération du Pays Basque;
 the AEP association of Pays de Soule;
 the sanitation association of Pays de Soule;
 the Energy association of Pyrénées-Atlantiques;
 the inter-communal association to support Basque culture.

Demography
The Journal'' by Pierre Casalivetery, Notary at Mauléon, during 1460-1481 counted 26 fires at Barcus and 210 for the years 1540–1548, indicating a rapidly growing population.

In 2017 the commune had 642 inhabitants.

Economy
Economic activity is mainly oriented towards agriculture (mixed farming and sheep farming). The commune is part of the Appellation d'origine contrôlée (AOC) zone designation of Ossau-iraty.

Culture and heritage

Civil heritage
The Lamiñen ziloa ("Cave of laminak" in Basque). Laminak are small lutins in Basque mythology.
A treasure trove of Celtiberian currency (400-100 BC.) was discovered in 1879. Composed of 1,750 silver coins from different cities of Navarre and Aragon, the reason for their presence in Barcus remains controversial.
A gaztelu zahar stands at 440 metres above sea level in the Haitzhandia locality.

Religious heritage
The Parish Church of the Ascension (Middle Ages) is registered as an historical monument. It was largely rebuilt in the 19th century and restored in the 20th century. It contains a Bronze Bell (1689) that is registered as an historical object.

Cultural events

In 2009 Barcus organised a Pastoral, a Soule traditional show mixing theatre, dancing and singing. There is a Pastoral throughout winter until April on Sundays in other villages of Soule.

Notable people linked to the communeLéon Urthuburu, vice-consul for France in Guayaquil, Ecuador, originally from Barcus, he bequeathed Floreana Island in the Galápagos Islands to the commune in 1860. Despite his efforts Barcus never took possession.Pierre Topet, alias "Etxahun", born in Barcus (1786-1862), a Basque poet.Jean Touan, born in 1817 at Barcus, was the founder of the Café Tortoni in Buenos Aires. The café was bequeathed to Célestin Curutchet in 1872, another native of Barcus.André Chilo''', French rugby player, born on 5 July 1898 at Bordeaux and died on 3 November 1982 at Barcus.

See also
Communes of the Pyrénées-Atlantiques department

Notes and references

Notes

References

Communes of Pyrénées-Atlantiques